Denis O'Gorman (22 May 1928 – 2011) was a British long-distance runner. He competed in the marathon at the 1960 Summer Olympics.

References

1928 births
2011 deaths
Athletes (track and field) at the 1960 Summer Olympics
British male long-distance runners
British male marathon runners
Olympic athletes of Great Britain
People from County Tipperary